Fischetti is an Italian surname. Notable people with the surname include:

John Fischetti, editorial cartoonist
Charles Fischetti
Rocco Fischetti
Fedele Fischetti, Italian painter
Matteo Fischetti, Italian pianist and composer 

Italian-language surnames